Chaos Theory is a computer demo by Conspiracy released in August 2006 at Assembly. It has been realised by Gergely Szelei, Barna Buza and Zoltán Szabó.

Technical description 
Chaos Theory is a 64K intro demo. It uses kkrunchy from farbrausch as packer.

Synopsis 
The demo opens with three circles and a black screen. On a green foliage pattern screen the words "Conspiracy", "Assembly 2006" appear, before showing a space opera scene with "a world not of my making yet a world of my design, so strange and so familiar" text. After a quiet moment, the rhythm of the music and the speed of the graphisms accelerates, to represent chaos. A device with imbricated rings moving up and down appears briefly. Then, the demo decreases again to a more quiet pace, prints geometry patterns before a second acceleration and a repeat of the previous patterns and elements, slightly different.

Awards 
The demo has been very well received by the critics. It was ranked second place at the Assembly 2006. Since, it has received several awards, like an honorary mention in the Prix Ars Electronica's Computer Animation / Film / VFX category in 2007. At Scene.org Awards, it won the  best 64K intro prize, and was also nominated in the  "Best Direction" and "Public Choice" categories. It was also presented at SIGGRAPH in 2007.

References

External links 
 Official site
 Chaos Theory on Pouët

Demos
2006 works